PPPA, or 3-phenoxy-3-phenylpropan-1-amine, is a drug which is described as an antidepressant. It was derived by Eli Lilly from the antihistamine diphenhydramine, a 2-diphenylmethoxyethanamine derivative with additional properties as a selective serotonin reuptake inhibitor (SSRI), and has been the basis for the subsequent discovery of a number of other antidepressant drugs.

List of PPPA derivatives
 Atomoxetine ((3R)-N-methyl-3-(2-methylphenoxy)-3-phenylpropan-1-amine) — NRI
 Fluoxetine (N-methyl-3-(4-(trifluoromethyl)phenoxy)-3-phenylpropan-1-amine) — SSRI
 N-Methyl-PPPA (N-methyl-3-phenoxy-3-phenylpropan-1-amine) — SNRI
 Nisoxetine (N-methyl-3-(2-methoxyphenoxy)-3-phenylpropan-1-amine) — NRI
 Norfluoxetine (3-(4-(trifluoromethyl)phenoxy)-3-phenylpropan-1-amine) — SSRI
 Seproxetine ((S)-3-(4-(trifluoromethyl)phenoxy)-3-phenylpropan-1-amine) — SSRI

Structurally related drugs include dapoxetine, duloxetine, edivoxetine, femoxetine, paroxetine, reboxetine, and viloxazine, all of which act, similarly, as monoamine reuptake inhibitors, and most of which are, again similarly, antidepressants.

Zimelidine is an antidepressant and SSRI which was derived from the antihistamine pheniramine, which, similarly to its analogues brompheniramine and chlorpheniramine, possesses SNRI properties. Fluvoxamine, another antidepressant and SSRI, was developed from the antihistamine tripelennamine, which possesses SNDRI actions.

See also
 Development and discovery of SSRI drugs
 Aryloxypropanamine scaffold
 Lometraline

References

Further reading
 

Amines
Antidepressants
Eli Lilly and Company brands
Serotonin–norepinephrine reuptake inhibitors